Azygophleps atrifasciata is a moth in the family Cossidae. It is found in Zimbabwe, Zambia, Uganda, Kenya, Angola, Malawi and South Africa.

References

Moths described in 1910
Azygophleps
Moths of Africa